The Mosi-oa-Tunya (English: The Smoke Which Thunders) is a gold coin introduced in Zimbabwe in 2022 in the context of rising inflation.

Nomenclature and characteristics 
The Mosi-oa-Tunya is the Tongan name for Victoria Falls and translates into the English language as The Smoke Which Thunders.

The coins weigh one troy ounce and are made of 22 carat gold. They were minted outside of Zimbabwe.

Use 

The Reserve Bank of Zimbabwe distributed 2,000 Mosi-oa-Tunya to commercial banks on 25 June 2022. They can be used for normal retail purposes. The coins were introduced in the context of instability with existing local currency and Zimbabweans tendency to use the U.S. dollar.

Value 
The coins are worth the international market rate for a troy ounce of gold, plus five per cent.

See also 

 Zimbabwean bond notes
 Zimbabwean bond coins
 Mosi-oa-Tunya National Park
 Zimbabwean dollar
 Krugerrand
 Dedollarisation

References

External links 

 Reserve Bank of Zimbabwe Website

Currencies of Africa
Currencies of Zimbabwe
Currencies introduced in 2022
Gold bullion coins